The Rimac Concept One, sometimes stylized as Concept_One, is a two-seat high-performance electric car designed and manufactured in Croatia by Rimac Automobili.

To advertise both Rimac Automobili and Formula E, the Concept One was used as the official zero-emission race director's car during the first season of Formula E championship in 2014.

History

Rimac Automobili, an automobile manufacturing company established in 2009 in Sveta Nedelja, Croatia, grew out of its founder Mate Rimac's garage hobby. The company's primary objective was to build the world's first electric sports car, starting, as Rimac put it, "with a blank sheet of paper". Since electric systems for high-performance electric cars were not available on the market, the company developed the necessary parts in-house and patented 24 innovations.

When Mate Rimac's 1984 BMW 3 series blew its internal combustion engine while participating in a race, the opportunity was taken to convert it into an electric car. Working on his own, Rimac managed to fit a  electric powertrain in his 3 series, which would soon become the company's first test mule. The car, now called the "Green Monster", set five Fédération Internationale de l'Automobile (FIA)-sanctioned acceleration records in April 2011. This attracted the attention of the media and potential investors. Rimac also converted several other BMW 3 series (E30) cars into electric cars after some customers expressed interest in having such a car seeing the success of Rimac's car, and after some success, he moved to the more ambitious project of developing a car of his own. As a result, the electric sports car named the Concept One was born.

The Concept One was introduced at the 2011 Frankfurt Motor Show, and afterwards shown at the 2012 Paris Concours d'Elegance, where it received a positive response by the general public and potential customers. The car was set to cost  once the serial production started in 2013. A limited production of 88 units was to be offered. The first car was delivered to an anonymous Spanish customer in January 2013.
Rimac participated at the 2015 Pikes Peak International Hill Climb with a  highly customised version called the E-Runner Concept_One. The vehicle took second place overall competing against ICE vehicles. The driver was the multiple Pikes Peak winner Nobuhiro Tajima.

After a series of incremental improvements, the final version of the car was presented at the March 2016 Geneva Motor Show. In 2017, the Concept One participated at the Goodwood Festival of Speed for the first time, breaking the EV speed record on a timed track.

On June 10, 2017, journalist and television presenter Richard Hammond crashed one of the eight produced Concept One vehicles during filming for Series 2 of The Grand Tour. Hammond was on his last run up a timed hill climb course during the Bergrennen Hemberg event, when, just after crossing the finish line, the car ran off the road. The car tumbled down the hill and eventually came to rest upside down  from the road. The car caught fire, and continued to spontaneously do so for five days according to fellow presenter James May. Hammond survived with a broken leg.

Specifications

Each wheel is powered by a separate liquid-cooled permanent magnet synchronous electric motor and controlled by the so-called "All Wheel Torque Vectoring System" that distributes the power to the wheels in accordance with user setup and driving conditions. The car features carbon ceramic brakes for improved stopping power. Also, the car has the ability to switch the power from front-wheel to rear-wheel drive or to equally distribute the power between all wheels.

The car's body is made of carbon fibre. The interior features custom leather upholstery and hand-made dashboard components.

In the subsequent version presented at the 2016 Geneva Motor Show, some performance figures were further optimised: the acceleration from 0– was achieved in 2.6 seconds, from 0– in 6.2 seconds, and from 0– in 14.2 seconds. The best  time recorded was 9.9 seconds.

In 2017, the 0– acceleration time was improved to 2.4 seconds. 0– took 2.5 seconds, 0– took 6 seconds, and  took 14 seconds.

Sales
In 2017, Rimac Automobili established official dealerships with PACE Germany, Manhattan Motorcars and Al Marooni Group for the regions of Europe, North America and the Middle East.

Concept S

The Concept S is a lighter, more powerful, more aerodynamic and track-oriented iteration of the Concept One. The car also receives a full aerodynamic package which includes a large carbon fibre front splitter, side skirts, racing slicks and a large rear wing that generates 34% more downforce than the Concept One. On the interior, the car features racing bucket seats with 4-point racing harness, a new steering wheel, a driver focused infotainment system that projects only the most important information on the central display and Alcantara trim. Production was limited to two cars.

Derived vehicles 
At the end of 2014 the Volar-e was put on the market. The company Applus+ IDIADA built this vehicle based on the Rimac Concept One, however, the battery size was reduced in order to save weight (38 kWh). The battery could be recharged in 15 minutes.

Reception
Dan Prosser, in a 2016 review for the magazine EVO, praised the vehicle's performance, styling, and torque vectoring system, but criticized its small cabin size and the brake pedal feel, giving it 3½ out of 5 stars. He nonetheless stated "The Concept One does lack the soundtrack and the dramatic power delivery of a conventional supercar, but in the way it accelerates and in the way its torque vectoring system picks apart a corner it is enormously entertaining to drive quickly" and concluded that the car "proves EVs can be spectacular to drive".

Richard Meaden wrote in EVO "Of all the emerging players, Croatian-based Rimac Automobili is by far the most interesting, the most authentic and, to my mind, the most evo. A leader in battery and electric-motor technology, its Concept One hypercar impressively showcases the fruits of its labours, with a huge amount of the car done in-house. ... If Rimac's own Concept One becomes a production reality it could well be a game-changer – the Tesla of the hypercar world."

In 2017, Road & Track tested the car on city streets and described it as an "electric techno extravaganza" and claimed that "the carbon tub you sit in is rigid as a nuclear bunker". It described the feeling of taking off in traffic as "utterly impressive" and noticed its quietness by stating that "Rimac's hypercar only makes a sound when its inverters kick in, as a gentle reminder that you're
sitting in the automotive equivalent of a small power station. A sexy, clean, fast and driftable power station."

The crew of Amazon Prime show The Grand Tour talked about the car in 2017 shortly after Richard Hammond's crash. Jeremy Clarkson, in a column for The Times, called it "amazing" and "brilliant", and stated that during his brief time behind the wheel he "couldn't believe how fast it accelerated", adding "we're not talking here about something that's as fast as Lamborghini Aventador. It is massively faster than that; it is faster than anything else I've ever driven by a huge, huge margin." Richard Hammond, when asked for his take on the car during an interview session for DriveTribe, said he "loved it; it was astonishing", maintaining it had "proper ambition in terms of range" and describing its all-wheel torque vectoring system as "breathtaking". He further commented that it "felt genuinely futuristic and modern" and that "we are going to have to invent a whole new vocabulary ... for the sounds these things make". James May described it as an "exquisite pearl white electrical delicacy".

Alex Roy tested the car in an episode for the NBC Sports programme /Drive that aired on October 26, 2017, and gave positive impressions. He stated "I haven’t driven anything this fast in my life. Absolutely changes the game." on Twitter.

The car was chosen as one of the Top 10 Tech Cars by the IEEE in 2018.

See also
List of electric cars currently available
List of modern production plug-in electric vehicles
Plug-in electric vehicle

References

External links

 
 Reuters video of the car in action
 Croatian Supercar Is Electric for a Reason
 

Cars of Croatia
Coupés
Electric sports cars
Electric concept cars
All-wheel-drive vehicles
Cars introduced in 2013
Concept_One